Don Carlos de Borbón y Austria-Este (Spanish: Carlos María de los Dolores Juan Isidro José Francisco Quirico Antonio Miguel Gabriel Rafael; French: Charles Marie des Douleurs Jean Isidore Joseph François Cyr Antoine Michel Gabriel Raphaël; 30 March 1848 – 18 July 1909) was the Carlist claimant to the throne of Spain from 1868 (his father's Spanish renunciation), and the Legitimist claimant to the throne of France after the death of his father in 1887.

Life
Carlos was born in Ljubljana, the capital of Carniola in what is now Slovenia, the elder son of Infante Juan, Count of Montizón and of his wife Maria Beatrix of Austria-Este. His name in full was Carlos María de los Dolores Juan Isidro José Francisco Quirico Antonio Miguel Gabriel Rafael. As an infant he lived with his family briefly in London where his younger brother Alfonso was born. After their father, considered too liberal for Carlist tastes, left their mother, the boys lived with her in Modena. Her brother Francis V, Duke of Modena was largely responsible for the education of the boys and was the chief influence in their early lives. Carlos was known for his Traditionalist views, much different from those of his father.

Family
On 4 February 1867, at Frohsdorf in Austria, Carlos married Princess Margherita of Parma, daughter of Carlos III, Duke of Parma and of his wife, Princess Louise Marie Thérèse of France.  The couple had five children:

 Blanca de Borbón y de Borbón-Parma (1868–1949) m in 1889 at Frohsdorf  Archduke Leopold Salvator of Austria, Prince of Tuscany and had issue.
 Jaime de Borbón y de Borbón-Parma (1870–1931)
 Elvira de Borbón y de Borbón-Parma (1871–1929) died unmarried (but with illegitimate issue who took the surname "de Bourbon", by artist Filippo Folchi).
 Beatriz de Borbón y de Borbón-Parma (1874–1961) married in Venice in 1892 Prince Fabrizio Massimo di Roviano (his mother was Donna Francesca di Paola Lucchesi-Palli, daughter of Princess Caroline of Naples and Sicily and her second husband)
 Alicia de Borbón y de Borbón-Parma (1876–1975) married (1) in 1897 Friedrich, Prince von Schönburg-Waldenburg at Venice and had issue, divorced 1903; (2) in 1906 at Viareggio, Lino del Prete and had issue.

De facto king
Carlos organized and led the Third Carlist War. Between 1872 and 1876 he effectively controlled much of peninsular Spain, having as much legitimacy as the Presidents of the First Republic.

Later life 
In January 1893 Carlos' wife, Margherita, died. The following year he decided to remarry.  He consulted his mother who suggested two ladies: Princess Theresia of Liechtenstein (daughter of Prince Alfred of Liechtenstein) and Princess Marie-Berthe de Rohan (daughter of Prince Arthur de Rohan).

Having met both ladies, Carlos decided on the latter and asked for her hand in marriage.

On 28 April 1894 Carlos and Berthe were married by Cardinal Schönborn in his private chapel in Prague. Berthe had a dominant personality, making the marriage very unpopular among Carlists. "All writers agree that this second marriage was disastrous, not only for the family of Don Carlos and for [Carlos] himself, but also for the [Carlist] party."

Carlos died in Varese in 1909. 
He is buried in the Cathedral of San Giusto in Trieste. 
His son Jaime followed in his father's footsteps of claiming the French and Spanish thrones.

Ancestry

References

Bibliography 

 Del Burgo, Jaime. Carlos VII y su tiempo: Leyenda y realidad. Pamplona: Gobierno de Navarra, 1994.
 "The Curé Santa Cruz and the Carlist War." Blackwood's Edinburgh Magazine (1873).
 "The Spanish Pretender: Who he is and What he has Been." The New York Times (May 31, 1874).
 

|-

1848 births
1909 deaths
People from Ljubljana
Legitimist pretenders to the French throne
Carlist pretenders to the Spanish throne
People of the Third Carlist War
Anti-Masonry in Spain
Navarrese titular monarchs